Historic St. James AME Church is a historic church, affiliated with the African Methodist Episcopal Church, the oldest predominantly African American denomination in the United States.  The church is located at 222 N. Roman Street in New Orleans, Louisiana.  Founded in 1844, Historic St. James is the first church of African Methodism established in the Deep South.  The church's pastor is the Reverend Dr. Demetrese Phillips.

The Neo-Gothic church was built in 1848 and added to the National Register of Historic Places in 1982.

Use in 21 Jump Street (2012) 

The church played the namesake role in the Hollywood blockbuster, 21 Jump Street (2012).

References

Methodist churches in Louisiana
Churches on the National Register of Historic Places in Louisiana
Gothic Revival church buildings in Louisiana
Churches completed in 1848
Methodist churches in New Orleans
National Register of Historic Places in New Orleans